Marco Antonio Vascheri was a Roman Catholic prelate who served as Bishop of Guardialfiera (1510–?).

Biography
In 1510, Marco Antonio Vascheri was appointed during the papacy of Pope Julius II as Bishop of Guardialfiera.
It is uncertain how long he served; the next bishop of record is Zacharias Ferrari who was appointed in 1519.

References

External links and additional sources
 (for Chronology of Bishops) 
 (for Chronology of Bishops) 

16th-century Italian Roman Catholic bishops
Bishops appointed by Pope Julius II